Comstock may refer to:

Places
Comstock Northwest, Michigan, a census-designated place
Comstock Park, Michigan, a census-designated place and unincorporated community 
Comstock Township, Michigan
Comstock, Minnesota, a city
Comstock Township, Marshall County, Minnesota
Comstock, Nebraska, a village
Comstock Township, Custer County, Nebraska
Comstock, North Dakota, an unincorporated community
Comstock, Texas, an unincorporated community
Comstock, Wisconsin, an unincorporated community
Comstock (crater), a lunar crater

Ships
USS Comstock (LSD-19), a dock landing ship of the United States Navy
USS Comstock (LSD-45), a dock landing ship of the United States Navy

Other uses
Comstock (surname), including a list of people with the name
Comstock Hall (Ithaca, New York), a building of Cornell University
Comstock High School, near Kalamazoo, Michigan
Comstock Lode and mines in Virginia City, Nevada
Comstock canned pie filling, line of products sold by the Duncan Hines brand; see Pinnacle Foods
Comstock Music Festivals, a series of music festivals near Comstock, Nebraska
Comstock Prison, the former name of Great Meadow Correctional Facility in New York State
Comstock Prize in Physics, awarded by the U.S. National Academy of Sciences
Comstock Scoring, the scoring method used in International Practical Shooting Confederation (IPSC) shooting competitions
Comstock Tram, at two locations in West Coast, Tasmania

See also
Comstock laws, anti-obscenity laws in the United States
United States v. Comstock, a decision by the Supreme Court of the United States